S75 may refer to:
 S75 (Berlin), a S-Bahn line
 Daihatsu Hijet (S75), a Japanese van
 , a submarine of the Israeli Navy
 S-75 Dvina, a Soviet surface-to-air missile
 Savoia-Marchetti SM.75 Marsupiale, an Italian transport aircraft
 Sikorsky S-75, an American prototype helicopter
 S75, a postcode district for Barnsley, England